Boyuk Shor Highway is a highway in Baku, Azerbaijan. It begins at the Koroglu Metro station with the intersection of Heydar Aliyev Avenue with the Darnagul Highway. It continues east towards Mardakan. It is named for nearby Lake Boyukshor though the lake is no longer visible from the highway due to the construction of the Olympic Stadium.

Sources
Boyuk Shore Highway

Streets in Baku